Hugo Raúl Aberastegui (born 28 September 1941) is an Argentine rower. He competed in the 1968, 1972, and 1976 Summer Olympics.

References

1941 births
Living people
Rowers at the 1968 Summer Olympics
Rowers at the 1972 Summer Olympics
Rowers at the 1976 Summer Olympics
Argentine male rowers
Olympic rowers of Argentina
Pan American Games medalists in rowing
Pan American Games gold medalists for Argentina
Pan American Games silver medalists for Argentina
Pan American Games bronze medalists for Argentina
Rowers at the 1967 Pan American Games
Rowers at the 1971 Pan American Games
Rowers at the 1975 Pan American Games
20th-century Argentine people